Anna "Anya" Garnis (Russian: Анна "Аня" Гарнис; born May 26, 1982) is a Latvian ballroom dancer based in New York City. In 2007 she was a finalist on the American reality television show So You Think You Can Dance.

In 2001, Garnis moved to the US with Pasha Kovalev to dance professionally. She was a top 20 finalist on So You Think You Can Dance, season 3, and went on to take part in the live tour. She was brought back to the program to take part as an all-star. Kovalev and Garnis were also the lead dancers in Burn the Floor. She was then the lead dancer in Dancing With the Stars Live in Las Vegas. Garnis rejoined Kovalev on the cast of Strictly Come Dancing as a professional dancer for series 11 in 2013, in which she was partnered with Casualty actor Patrick Robinson. They reached the semi-finals, before losing the dance-off to Natalie Gumede and Artem Chigvintsev.

Garnis returned to Strictly Come Dancing in Week 11, Series 13 to replace Ola Jordan for professional dances only. Her partner in those dances is Pasha Kovalev.

References

External links

So You Think You Can Dance official site
Strictly Come Dancing television series, up to Series 11, week 12

Living people
1982 births
So You Think You Can Dance (American TV series) contestants
Russian ballroom dancers
Dancing with the Stars
21st-century American dancers
21st-century Russian dancers
Latvian expatriates in England